Hobson City is a town in Calhoun County, Alabama, United States. At the 2020 census, the population was 759. It is included in the Anniston-Oxford Metropolitan Statistical Area.

Hobson City was Alabama's first self-governed all-black municipality.

History

According to Town Hall records, much of the area now included in the corporate limits of Hobson City was once within the adjoining city of Oxford, Alabama. During the late 19th century, the area was known as "Mooree Quarter". The black vote from that area was a controlling factor during municipal elections. An account provided by an early settler of the community has been passed down through the years. In that account, a black person was elected as the Oxford justice of the peace. As a result, and in keeping with campaign promises, Mayor Whitehead of Oxford went to the state capitol and had the corporate boundaries of Oxford redrawn to exclude Mooree Quarter and the black vote.

The town was incorporated on August 16, 1899. Records from a contemporary Alabama newspaper, The Peoples' Journal, described the municipality as "the only municipality controlled and governed entirely by colored people anywhere in the United States." The newspaper further commented, "The whole country will doubtless be interested in the result of this experiment." Under the leadership of the first mayor, S. L. Davis, and the first police chief, James Duran, police protection was restored to the area. The town was named after Richmond P. Hobson, a white naval hero in the then-recent Spanish-American War and member of Congress. Newman O'Neal was the mayor in 1919 until he faced death threats and was assaulted by the Ku Klux Klan forcing him to flee the city. The mayor in 1970, J. R. Striplin, was its thirteenth black mayor in succession. The town recently had buildings placed on the National Register of Historic Places and is currently in the process of qualifying other buildings as well. During November 2008, Alberta C. McCrory was sworn in as the 2008–2012 mayor.

Geography
Hobson City is located in southern Calhoun County at 33°37'6.589" North, 85°50'36.330" West (33.618497, -85.843425). It is bordered by the city of Oxford to the south and the city of Anniston to the north.

Demographics

As of the census of 2000, there were 878 people, 363 households, and 242 families residing in the town. The racial makeup of the town was 92.71% Black, 6.15% White, 0.23% from other races, and 0.91% from two or more races. 0.57% of the population were Hispanic or Latino of any race.

There were 363 households, out of which 30.0% had children under the age of 18 living with them, 26.2% were married couples living together, 35.3% had a female householder with no husband present, and 33.1% were non-families. 29.8% of all households were made up of individuals, and 10.5% had someone living alone who was 65 years of age or older. The average household size was 2.42 and the average family size was 2.99.

In the town, the age distribution of the population shows 28.6% under the age of 18, 8.2% from 18 to 24, 29.0% from 25 to 44, 23.0% from 45 to 64, and 11.2% who were 65 years of age or older. The median age was 35 years. For every 100 females, there were 76.0 males. For every 100 females age 18 and over, there were 71.3 males.

The median income for a household in the town was $17,589, and the median income for a family was $20,368. Males had a median income of $21,667 versus $19,583 for females. The per capita income for the town was $8,992. About 30.7% of families and 30.2% of the population were below the poverty line, including 42.7% of those under age 18 and 15.5% of those age 65 or over.

References

 - Total pages: 277

External links
 Hobson City Community & Economic Development Inc.

Towns in Alabama
Towns in Calhoun County, Alabama
Populated places in Alabama established by African Americans